Elmhurst was a station of the Port Washington Branch of the Long Island Rail Road. It was located on Broadway between Cornish and Whitney Avenues in the Elmhurst section of Queens, New York City.
In 2014, the Metropolitan Transportation Authority (MTA) had proposed to rebuild the station.  only a preliminary design study is funded, with construction being considered for a future MTA capital program.

History

19th and 20th century stations
The first depot opened as Newtown in 1855 by the Flushing Railroad, and was demolished in 1888. The second depot opened around December 1888, was renamed Elmhurst in June 1897, had high platforms constructed in 1912, and was demolished around 1927. The elevated third and most recent depot opened in 1927 and was finally closed on January 22, 1985, being demolished shortly after. It stood on the east side of Broadway, a block south of the Elmhurst Avenue subway station.

21st century revival
In March 2012, the Long Island Rail Road and lawmakers announced they were considering building a new station at Elmhurst to restore service to the area, at an estimated cost of $20 to $30 million. The 2015–2019 MTA capital program initially included $40 million to design and construct the new station, which was proposed to be in the same location as the old one. However, in a 2017 amendment, the agency postponed the construction of the new station indefinitely, only including $3 million to fund station design.

In 2022, as part of its 20-year needs assessment, the MTA proposed reviving plans for the station and funding construction in a future capital program. This will be evaluated for funding on a "level playing field" with other potential projects. In February 2023, Congresswoman Grace Meng of New York's 6th congressional district announced her renewed effort to reopen the station, sending a letter to LIRR Interim President Catherine Rinaldi. The letter received seven signatures from Meng's colleagues, who cited providing more "accessible modes of public transportation" and relieving crowding on the nearby Flushing Line as justifications for returning the station to service.

Station layout

The Elmhurst station was built on ground level, later raised onto an embankment traversing Broadway past Whitney Avenue. The station had a two side platforms and a pedestrian underpass connecting the intersection of Ketcham Place and 43rd Avenue with the intersection of Dongan Avenue and 88th Street. The underpass remains open today. Additionally, there was an entrance to the Port Washington-bound platform near the corner of Cornish Avenue and Broadway. Additionally, there was a freight loading area near the Durkee Spice Factory (now the new Elmhurst Educational Complex) where freight would be unloaded.

References

External links
Pride in Port: The Jekyll & Hyde Branch of the Long Island Railroad: (Forgotten New York)
Bob Andersen's Unofficial LIRR History Website
Port Washington Branch Stations
Bob Emery Maps of Elmhurst Station

Former Long Island Rail Road stations in New York City
Elmhurst, Queens
Railway stations in the United States opened in 1855
Railway stations closed in 1985
1855 establishments in New York (state)
1985 disestablishments in New York (state)
Proposed Long Island Rail Road stations